The Magpie River is a river in Algoma District, northeastern Ontario, Canada, The river empties into Michipicoten Bay on Lake Superior near the town of Wawa.

Course
From the north end of Esnagi Lake, the Five Mile Portage leads north, over Five Mile Creek, to Five Mile Bay on Kabinakagami Lake on the Kabinakagami River, part of the Albany River system, which leads north to James Bay. An alternate route to James Bay is to take the further Pine Portage from Kabinakagami Lake then up the Oba River to the Albany Forks, from which the Mattawitchewan River flows downstream as part of the Missinaibi and Moose rivers into the bay.

At Esnagi Lake, the river takes in the right tributary Tripoli Creek. The Magpie river then leaves Esnagi Lake at the south end at Swanson, where the Canadian Pacific Railway transcontinental mainline crosses. The river takes in the left tributary Hobon Creek just upstream of the community of Dubreuilville. There, it takes in the left tributary Herman Creek, is crossed by Highway 519, and takes a sharp turn west. The Soderston Creek enters from the right, and the river passes over the Toolong Rapids, where it once again heads south. The Evans Creek enters from the right, and the Magpie River passes over the Cedar Falls, then further downstream the Steephill Falls. The river takes in the right tributary Catfish Creek, and reaches Wawa, where it is crossed by the Algoma Central Railway branch line to Michipicoten Harbour and Highway 17. The river then passes over the Magpie Falls, and takes in the Michipicoten River just before its mouth at Michipicoten Bay on Lake Superior at the site of Michipicoten Provincial Park.

Economy
There are also several hydroelectric plants on the river. The largest hydroelectric is located at Steephill Falls.

Tributaries
Michipicoten River (left)
Catfish Creek (right)
Evans Creek (right)
Soderston Creek (right)
Herman Creek (left)
Hobon Creek (left)
Peckerwood Creek (left)
Tripoli Creek (right)

See also
List of rivers of Ontario

References

Rivers of Algoma District
Tributaries of Lake Superior